The Fusil ametrallador Oviedo is a Spanish copy of the ZB vz. 26 and ZB vz. 30 Czechoslovak light machine guns.

History 
In 1943, Francoist Spain ordered 7.92×57mm Mauser ZB vz. 30 machine guns to the German-occupied Zbrojovka Brno but received only 100 guns. It was decided to produce a copy in Oviedo. The first prototype was built in 1951 and production began. 10.508 were produced until 1958 and Egypt received 700 of them. Some were modified in 1959 to use a 7.62×51mm NATO 50-round belt loaded in a drum. This modified variant, sometimes used on a tripod, was known as the FAO Model 59.

Service 
The FAO was nicknamed Pepito and saw service during the Ifni War against the Moroccan Army of Liberation. It was replaced by the MG 42/59 (MG1).

References

External links 
 Image of a 7.62mm FAO 59

7.62×51mm NATO machine guns
Military equipment introduced in the 1950s
7.92×57mm Mauser machine guns
Machine guns of Spain